The Play-offs of the 2001 Fed Cup Americas Zone Group II were the final stages of the Group II Zonal Competition involving teams from the Americas. Using the positions determined in their pools, the eight teams faced off to determine their overall placing in the 2001 Fed Cup Americas Group II. The top two teams (i.e. the teams that won matches in the first round of the top quarter) advanced to Group I next year.

Draw

First round

Puerto Rico vs. Cuba

Costa Rica vs. Bahamas

Bolivia vs. Bermuda

Guatemala vs. Chile

Jamaica vs. Trinidad and Tobago

El Salvador vs. Panama

Antigua and Barbuda vs. Barbados

Repchage Round

Cuba vs. Costa Rica

Bermuda vs. Guatemala

Trinidad and Tobago vs. Panama

Second round

Puerto Rico vs. Bahamas

Bolivia vs. Chile

Jamaica vs. El Salvador

Final Placements

  and  advanced to Group I for next year, where they respectively placed last and third in the same pool of four. Puerto Rico, thus, was relegated back down to Group II for 2003.

See also
Fed Cup structure

References

External links
 Fed Cup website

2001 Fed Cup Americas Zone